The 2019–20 AFC Bournemouth season was the club's fifth consecutive season in the top flight of English football and their 130th year in existence. This season, Bournemouth participated in the Premier League and also participated in the EFL Cup and the FA Cup. The season covered the period from 1 July 2019 to 30 June 2020, which was extended to 26 July 2020 due to the COVID-19 pandemic. Bournemouth were relegated to the EFL Championship after five years in the Premier League on the final day of the season as they finished just one point from safety in 18th, with their relegation followed by the exit of manager Eddie Howe after eight years in charge five days after the season concluded.

Squad

Current squad

Transfers

Transfers in

Loans in

Loans out

Transfers out

Pre-season
In May 2019, AFC Bournemouth announced friendlies with AFC Wimbledon, Brentford and Lazio.

Competitions

Premier League

League table

Results summary

Results by matchday

Matches
On 13 June 2019, the Premier League fixtures were announced.

FA Cup

EFL Cup

The second round draw was made on 13 August 2019 following the conclusion of all but one first round matches. The third round draw was confirmed on 28 August 2019, live on Sky Sports.

Squad statistics

|-
! colspan=14 style=background:#dcdcdc; text-align:center|Goalkeepers

|-
! colspan=14 style=background:#dcdcdc; text-align:center|Defenders

|-
! colspan=14 style=background:#dcdcdc; text-align:center|Midfielders

|-
! colspan=14 style=background:#dcdcdc; text-align:center|Forwards

|-
! colspan=14 style=background:#dcdcdc; text-align:center|Players who have made an appearance or had a squad number this season but have left the club

|-
|}

References

A.F.C. Bournemouth
AFC Bournemouth seasons